Wageningen University & Research (also known as Wageningen UR; abbreviation: WUR) is a public university in Wageningen, Netherlands, specializing in life sciences with a focus on agriculture, technical and engineering subjects. It is a globally important center for life sciences and agricultural research. It is located in a region of the Netherlands known as the Food Valley.

WUR consists of Wageningen University and the former agricultural research institutes of the Dutch Ministry of Agriculture. Wageningen University, as a research university, grants degrees at the BSc, MSc and PhD level in life and social sciences. It focuses its research on scientific, social and commercial problems in the field of life sciences and natural resources. It is widely known for its agriculture, forestry, and environmental studies programs. The university has about 12,000 students from over 100 countries. It is a member of the Euroleague for Life Sciences (ELLS) university network.

WUR has been placed among the top 150 universities in the world by four major ranking tables. Wageningen has been voted the number one university in the Netherlands for seventeen consecutive years. The university is listed number 59 in the world by the Times Higher Education Ranking and the world's best in agriculture and forestry by the QS World University Rankings 2016–2020. Wageningen University is ranked number one in the fields of plant/animal science, environment/ecology, and agricultural sciences by U.S. News & World Report. The university is widely regarded as the world's top agricultural research institution.

History 

In 1876 the Rijkslandbouwschool (National Agricultural College) was established in Wageningen. Due to the development of the training to a higher educational level it changed in 1896 to the Hoogere Land- en Boschbouwschool (Agricultural and Forestry College) and in 1904 in Rijks Hoogere Land-, Tuin- en Boschbouwschool (National Agricultural, Horticulture and Forestry College).

In 1918 the school became academic by law (Academic Education Act). The name changed to Rijks Landbouw Hoogeschool (National Agricultural College). The opening date and official start date is 9 March 1918.

In 1986 the "hogescholen" (comparable to scientific institute of technology) were renamed to University in a modification of the Academic Education Act. The new name became Landbouwuniversiteit Wageningen (LUW) (Wageningen Agricultural University (WAU)). The 1986 law changes resulted in the use of the name hogeschool in the Dutch system to be used exclusively for universities of applied science.

Over the years the research and teaching branched out into life sciences in general, while interest for agriculture as a career opportunity waned. In 1997, when the DLO institutes merged with the university, the new organisation was rebranded as Wageningen UR (Wageningen University and Research Centre); with the university being renamed Wageningen University. Under Dutch laws the university and the institutes had to remain separate legal entities.

In 2006, the university of applied sciences Van Hall Larenstein became part of Wageningen UR. The idea was to create better collaboration between applied teaching and research at Van Hall and the academic research at Wageningen University. This would also support students to continue with an academic program upon completing their applied degree. However, due to differences in organizational culture and incompatibility of procedures, the collaboration remained problematic. In 2012 it was decided that Van Hall Larenstein would leave Wageningen UR and continue as an independent school once more. In the spring of 2015 the separation was marked by the move of the final Wageningen-based Van Hall Larenstein studies back to Velp.

In 2009 it was decided that the university would consistently use the English name in its communication, and that university research could be presented under the name of the university: Wageningen University (WU) (as an alternative of using the name Wageningen UR). On 6 September 2016 Wageningen University and the research institutes became one joint brand: Wageningen University & Research (WUR).

On 9 March 2018 Wageningen University celebrated her 100 years anniversary. During this year there were many events and festivities around the campus and in the city of Wageningen.

Academic profile
Wageningen University was the first Dutch university or school that was allowed to use the European Credit Transfer and Accumulation System (ECTS) label. This label is awarded by the European Commission and guarantees the quality of the study programme. The university consequently applies this system, thus promoteing the mobility of students within Europe and preventing study delay.

BSc programmes

The university offers 19 BSc programmes (2018-2019). For some BSc programmes, the language of instruction is English. Other programmes teach in both Dutch and English. The programmes start each year in September, last three years, and consist of 180 ECTS credits. The programmes are in the field of economy and society, health, life sciences and technology, nature and environment, animals and plants.

MSc programmes

Wageningen University offers 36 different MSc programmes (2017-2018) and two online masters programs. The language of instruction for all Master's programmes is English. The programmes start each year in September, they last two years, and consist of 120 ECTS credits. Most programmes offer various specializations and possibilities for majors.

PhD programme
The PhD programme is a four-year programme which consists of a research component (conducting research under supervision and writing a thesis) and a smaller education component (up to 10 percent of the total PhD time). To apply for a PhD position, the applicant must contact one of the six Graduate Schools of Wageningen University. In order to guarantee adequate supervision, the research subject must fit in the research programme of a Graduate School.

Research institutes

The following research institutes are part of Wageningen Research:
Wageningen Environmental Research, formerly Alterra
Wageningen Economic Research, formerly LEI Wageningen UR
Wageningen Bioveterinary Research, formerly Central Veterinary Institute
Wageningen Centre for Development Innovation, formerly Centre for Development Innovation
Wageningen Food & Biobased Research, formerly Food & Biobased Research
Wageningen Livestock Research
Wageningen Marine Research, formerly IMARES
Wageningen Plant Research
Dairy Campus
 Wageningen Food Safety Research, formerly RIKILT

Controversy 
Wageningen University and Research has come under fire due to claims of partiality in research. One case regards a research concerning bee colony collapse disorder. Research conducted by Tjeerd Blacquière on the topic has caused controversy due to funding received for the research from the German pesticide producer Bayer, the world's biggest producer of neonicotinoid insecticides, a suspect factor for the colony collapse disorder.

In 2018 the Dutch magazine OneWorld went to court in an attempt to demand access to contracts between WUR and Bayer, Syngenta and Monsanto, but OneWorld ultimately lost the court case.

Rankings

International rankings

In the field of life sciences, agricultural and environmental science, the university is considered world-class. According to the Times Higher Education World University Rankings it is the best university in the Netherlands and No. 1 worldwide, in agriculture and forestry for 2017 on the QS World University Rankings charts.

In the 2019 U.S. News & World Report Ranking Wageningen University & Research is ranked first in agricultural sciences, plant and animal sciences, and environment/ecology.
In the 2017/2018 National Taiwan Ranking Wageningen University is ranked first in the field of agriculture.
In the 2017/2018 National Taiwan Ranking Wageningen University is ranked first in the field of Environment & Ecology.
In the 2016 Shanghai Ranking Wageningen University was ranked in the bracket 101-150th best universities in the world overall and 36th best in the life and agriculture sciences.
In the 2017 Times Higher Education World University Rankings Wageningen University was ranked 25th overall in the world and 16th in life sciences.
In the Academic Ranking of World Universities 2017 Wageningen University & Research is ranked first in the field of Food Science & Technology.
In the 2016/2017 QS World University Rankings, Wageningen University was ranked 119th overall in the world, first in the field of agriculture and forestry, fourth in environmental science, 13th in development studies, and 83rd in life sciences and medicine.

National rankings
The Dutch '' ranking compares Dutch universities based on reviews by their own students. In 2021 Wageningen University is ranked as the best university in the Netherlands in full-time education for the 17th time in a row.

Student activities and associations

 M.S.V. Alchimica is the study association for students Molecular Life Sciences. Since 1970 it has been organising different activities for its members.
 CODON is the study Association for all Biotechnology (BBT and MBT), Bioinformatics (MBF) and Biobased Sciences (MBS) students. Established by the first students of Bioprocestechnologie on 16 September 1991. At that time the association carried the name "BiPS" which was later changed to CODON.
Nitocra is the study association for students of International Land and Water management.
Semper Florens is the study association for students of the bachelor Plant Sciences (BPS), the master Plant Sciences (MPS), the master Plant Biotechnology (MPB) and the master Organic Agriculture (MOA).
HeerenXVII is the study association for students of following the bachelor 'Agrotechnologie' or the masters ' Biosystems Engineering'.
Nicolas Appert is the study association of the students for Food Technology including all masters programmes. It is named after the famous professor Nicolas Appert who invented the technique of 'canning'.
Mercurius is the social science association for students at the WUR following either the bachelor 'management and consumer studies', 'economics and governance' or the master 'Management, Economics and Consumer studies'.
Licere is the study association of the students for MTO Tourism, Leisure and Environment masters programme.

Notable alumni and staff

 Dirk Bezemer (born 1971), economist
Jan Bieleman
Jan Just Bos
Gerrit Braks

Jeroen Dijsselbloem

Heather M. Ferguson

Louise Fresco
Volkert van der Graaf, murderer of Pim Fortuyn

Gerrit Hiemstra
 J. G. ten Houten, extraordinarius (Extraordinary Professor) from 1971-'76
George Tawia Odamtten
Piet de Jong
Martijn Katan
Ruud Koopmans

Joan Leemhuis-Stout
Gatze Lettinga
Helga van Leur

F. H. van Naerssen
Jan Odink

Ramsewak Shankar
Bernard Slicher van Bath
Willie Smits
Marco Fraaije

, first Dutch woman on Mount Everest
Jan-Benedict Steenkamp

Jan Valckenier Suringar
Abbie Richards
Cees Veerman

Annemiek van Vleuten
Joris Voorhoeve
Anne Vondeling
Marijke Vos
Willem de Vos (academic)
Henk Vredeling
Simon Vroemen
, CEO of Heineken

Hendrik de Wit

Onno van de Stolpe

See also

 List of agricultural universities
 World Soil Museum
 Open access in the Netherlands

References

External links

Wageningen University & Research

1918 establishments in the Netherlands
Agricultural universities and colleges in the Netherlands
Education in Gelderland
Educational institutions established in 1918
Forestry education
History of Wageningen
Universities in the Netherlands